In mathematics, an eigenoperator, A, of a matrix H is a linear operator such that

 

where  is a corresponding scalar called an eigenvalue.

References

Linear algebra
Matrix theory